Juan Peregrino Anselmo (30 April 1902 – 27 October 1975) was a Uruguayan footballer who played as a striker for Uruguay national team. He was a member of national team which won 1930 FIFA World Cup. He scored three goals in the tournament, including two in the semi-finals. He was the first false 9 in a World Cup. He was part of squad which won gold medal at the 1928 Summer Olympics, but did not play in any games. He was a player and later coach of C.A. Peñarol. As coach, succeeding mid-1962 the Hungarian Béla Guttmann in office, he led the club to the Uruguayan championship of the same year. In the later part of 1963 the Uruguayan goalkeeper Roque Maspoli succeeded him.

International goals
Scores and results list Uruguay's goal tally first, score column indicates score after each Anselmo goal.

Honours
Peñarol
 Primera División (AUF): 1928, 1929, 1932, 1935
 Primera División (FUF/CP): 1924 FUF, 1926 CP

Uruguay
 FIFA World Cup: 1930
 South American Championship: 1935
 Summer Olympics: 1928

References

1902 births
1930 FIFA World Cup players
1975 deaths
Uruguayan footballers
Association football forwards
Uruguayan Primera División players
Centro Atlético Fénix players
Peñarol players
Uruguay international footballers
Olympic footballers of Uruguay
Footballers at the 1928 Summer Olympics
Olympic gold medalists for Uruguay
FIFA World Cup-winning players
Uruguayan football managers
Peñarol managers
Olympic medalists in football
Medalists at the 1928 Summer Olympics